Blair is an Scots-English-language name of Scottish Gaelic origin. 

The surname is derived from any of the numerous places in Scotland called Blair, derived from the Scottish Gaelic blàr, meaning "plain", "meadow" or "field", frequently a “battlefield””. 

The given name Blair is unisex and derived from the surname. Blair is generally a masculine name in Scotland and Canada, although it is more popular in the United States, where it is also a feminine name. A variant spelling of the given name is Blaire. In 2016, in the United States, Blair was the 521st most popular name for girls born that year, and the 1807th most popular for boys.

Scottish Clans
Clan Blair

People with the surname

A–E
Adam Blair (born 1986), New Zealand rugby league player
Andrew M. Blair (1818–???), American politician in Wisconsin
Andy Blair (born 1959) Scottish footballer
Anthony Blair (criminal) (1849–1879), American hanged for murder
Austin Blair (1818–1894), Governor of Michigan
B. Brian Blair (born 1957), American professional wrestler and local politician
Bill Blair (disambiguation), several people
Bonnie Blair (born 1964), American Olympic gold medalist in speed skating
Bruce G. Blair (1947–2020), American activist
Cherie Blair (born 1954), British barrister and wife of Tony Blair
Cheyse Blair (born 1992), Australian Rugby League player
Clancy Blair, American psychologist
Danny Blair  (1905–1985), Scottish footballer
David Blair (disambiguation), several people
DeJuan Blair (born 1989), American basketball player
Dennis C. Blair (born 1947), United States Director of National Intelligence
Doug Blair (born 1963), American heavy metal guitarist
Doug Blair (footballer) (1921–1998), footballer
Edmund Blair Leighton, (1852–1922), English artist
Ellen A. Dayton Blair (1837–1926), American social reformer and art teacher
Emily Newell Blair (1877–1951), American writer, suffragette, and founder of League of Women Voters
Eric Arthur Blair (1903–1950), an author better known by his pen name George Orwell
Euan Blair (born 1984), British businessman and son of Tony Blair
Everard Blair (1866–1939), English soldier and cricketer

F–M
Francis Preston Blair (1791–1876), influential 19th-century American journalist and politician
Francis Preston Blair Jr. (1821–1875), 19th-century American politician and American Civil War general
 Francis Simpson Blair (1839–1899), Virginia's Attorney General from 1882 to 1886
Frederick Blair (1874–1959), director of Canada's Immigration Branch
Garfield Blair (born 1987), Jamaican basketball player
George A. Blair (1915–2013), American businessman
George W. Blair (1921–2020), American politician and rancher
Gwenda Blair (born 1943), American author and journalist
Harold Blair (1924–1976), Australian tenor and Aboriginal activist
Harvey Blair (born 2003), English footballer
Henry W. Blair (1834–1920), United States Representative and Senator from New Hampshire
Hugh Blair (1718–1800), Scottish author
Hugh Blair (composer) (1864–1932), English musician, composer and organist
Hugh E. Blair (1909–1967), linguist and co-developer of Interlingua
Iain Blair (1942–2011), Scottish journalist, actor and author
Ian Blair (born 1953), former Commissioner of the Metropolitan Police, London
James Blair (Australian judge) (1870–1944), Australian judge
James Blair (cricketer) (1900–1961), New Zealand cricketer
James Blair (footballer) (1883–1913), Scottish footballer
James Blair (Indian Army officer) (1828–1905), Scottish recipient of the Victoria Cross
James Blair (MP) (1788–1841), Scots-Irish Member of Parliament
James Blair (South Carolina) (1786–1834), American politician
James Blair (Virginia) (1656–1743), Scottish clergyman and founder of the College of William and Mary
Jayson Blair (born 1976), former New York Times reporter
Jayson Blair (actor) (born 1984), American actor
Jimmy Blair (footballer, born 1888) (died 1964), former Scottish international footballer
Jimmy Blair (footballer, born 1918) (died 1983), Scottish professional footballer
John Blair Jr. (1732–1800), 18th-century American politician and one of the first Associate Justices of the U.S. Supreme Court
John Insley Blair (1802–1899), railroad tycoon
John Leo Blair (1888–1962), businessman, founder of Blair Corporation
John T. Blair (1885–1976), architect 
June Blair (1933-2022), American actress and model
Kenneth Blair (1882–1952), English entomologist
Lewis Harvie Blair (1834–1916), American businessman and author
Leo Blair (1923–2012), father of Tony Blair
Linda Blair (born 1959), American actress
Lionel Blair (1928–2021), Canadian-born British entertainer
Marquise Blair (born 1997), American football player
Mary Blair (1911–1978),  American artist, animator
Matthew Blair (disambiguation), several people
Maybelle Blair (born 1927), All-American Girls Professional Baseball League player
Mike Blair (born 1981), Scotland rugby union international
Montgomery Blair  (1813–1883), American politician and lawyer

N–Z
Natalie Blair (born 1984), Australian actress
Patricia Blair (1933–2013), American actress
 Patrick Blair (surgeon) (–1728), Scottish surgeon-apothecary
Paul Blair (1882–1904), American football player
Paul Blair (baseball) (1944–2013), American baseball player
Paul Blair (born 1978), American music producer, songwriter and DJ better known as DJ White Shadow
Preston Blair (1908–1994), American animator for Disney, MGM, and Hanna-Barbera
Randy Blair (born 1983), actor and writer
Richard Blair (disambiguation), several people
Robert Blair (disambiguation), several people
Saira Blair (born 1996), American politician
Selma Blair (born 1972), actress
G. W. Scott Blair (1902–1987) rheologist
Seth Blair (born 1989), American baseball player
Steven Blair (born 1939), American exercise scientist
Tom Blair (1892–1961), Scottish football goalkeeper 
Tony Blair (born 1953), British politician and Prime Minister of the United Kingdom, 1997–2007
Walter Blair (disambiguation), several people
William Blair (disambiguation), several people
Wren Blair (1925–2013), Canadian ice hockey coach

People with the given name

A–E
Blair Adams (born 1991), English football player
Blair Bann (born 1988), Canadian volleyball player
Blair Brown  (born 1946), actress
Blair Brown (American football) (born 1994), American football player
Blair Butler (born 1978), American stand-up comedian
Blair Chenoweth, beauty queen
Blair Dunlop (born 1992), English musician and actor
Blair Effron (born 1962), American financier and co-founder of Centerview Partners

F–M
Blair Fowler (born 1993), YouTube beauty guru
Blair Hinkle (born 1986), American professional poker player
Blair Hopping (born 1980), New Zealand field hockey player
Blair Horn (born 1961), Canadian rower
Blair Hull (born 1942), American businessman and politician
Blair Imani (born 1993), an African-American activist
Blair Joscelyne (born 1978), Australian composer, songwriter, and co-host of Mighty Car Mods
Blair Kiel (1961–2012), American football player
Blair Kinghorn (born 1997), Scotland Rugby Union international
Blair Late (born 1982), American pop singer
Blair Lee I (1857–1944), Lieutenant Governor of Maryland
Blair Lee III (1916–1985), Lieutenant Governor of Maryland
Blair Lekstrom (born 1961), Canadian politician
Blair Levin (born 1954), American lawyer
Blair Lewis (born 1956), an American gastroenterologist
Blair Longley (born 1950), Canadian politician
Blair MacKichan, English musician
Blair McDonough (born 1981), Australian actor
Blair Milan (1981–2011), Australian actor and television presenter

N–Z
Blair Peach (1946–1979), New Zealand-born activist, a victim of police brutality
Blair Peters, Canadian animator and co-founder of Studio B Productions
Blair Phillips (born 1984), former American football linebacker
Blair Redford (born 1983), American actor
Blair St. Clair (born 1995), American drag queen
Blair Stewart (ice hockey) (born 1953), Canadian hockey player
Blair Stewart (rugby union) (born 1983), New Zealand rugby player
Blair Stewart-Wilson (1929–2011), British army officer
Blair Sturrock (born 1981), Scottish footballer
Blair Underwood (born 1964), American actor
Blair Walsh (born 1990), American football player
Blair White (born 1987), former American football wide receiver
Blaire White (born 1993), American YouTuber and political commentator
Blair Wilson (born 1963), Canadian former member of parliament

Fictional characters
Blair (Soul Eater), a character from the manga and anime series Soul Eater
Blair Cramer, a character in the television series One Life to Live
Blair Dame, a character in the video game Street Fighter EX
Blair Waldorf, a character in the novels and television series Gossip Girl
Blair Warner, a character in the television series The Facts of Life
Blair, a main character in the animated television series Sunny Day
Blair Willows (Princess Sophia), a main character in animated film Barbie: Princess Charm School
Blaire Wilson, an American Girl character
Blair Pfaff, a main character in the television series Black Monday
Blair, a main character in the film The Thing

References

English feminine given names
English masculine given names
English unisex given names
English-language surnames
English-language unisex given names